Ilo District is one of three districts of the province Ilo in Peru.

Mayor: Gerardo Felipe Carpio Díaz (2019-2022)

See also 

 Administrative divisions of Peru

References